Nivaldo Batista may refer to:

Nivaldo Batista Santana (born 1980), Brazilian football player
Nivaldo Batista Lima (born 1989), Brazilian singer known as Gusttavo Lima